Little Island can refer to:

Geographical areas

Australia
 Little Island (South Australia)
 Little Island (Tasmania)
 Little Island (Western Australia)

Canada
 Little Island (Lake Kagawong), Ontario

Ireland
 Little Island, Cork
 Little Island, Waterford

United Kingdom
 Little Island, Anguilla

United States
 Little Island (Alabama), Alabama
 Little Island (Napa County), California
 Little Island (Massachusetts), Massachusetts
 Little Island (Crab Alley Bay), Maryland
 Little Island (Sillery Bay), Maryland
 Little Island (Michigan), Michigan
 Little Island at Pier 55, New York, artificial island and public park
 Isle of the Senecas, New York, also known as Little Island
 Little Island (Washington), one of the San Juan Islands
 Little Island (District of Columbia), adjacent to Theodore Roosevelt Island in Washington, D.C.

Popular culture
 The Little Island (book), a 1946 children's picture book by Margaret Wise Brown (writing as Golden McDonald) and Leonard Weisgard
 The Little Island (film), a 1958 British animated short film
 Little Island Comics, a comic book shop for children in Toronto, Ontario, Canada
 "Little Island", a song by Randy Newman from the musical Randy Newman's Faust

Other
 Little Island, an Irish publishing company